The 1993 Los Angeles Dodgers season was the 104th for the franchise in Major League Baseball, and their 36th season in Los Angeles, California.

The team improved on the dismal 1992 season, finishing fourth in the Western Division of the National League. This was in part thanks to Rookie of the Year winner catcher Mike Piazza. Piazza set rookie records with 35 home runs and 112 RBI. He also hit two home runs on the last day of the season as the Dodgers knocked their longtime rival the Giants out of playoff contention with a 12–1 victory at Dodger Stadium.

The season was marred by the sudden death of Hall of Fame pitcher Don Drysdale, who had been a broadcaster since his retirement in 1969. Drysdale, who pitched on three World Series championship teams in Los Angeles (1959, 1963, 1965), was found dead in his Montreal hotel room July 3 prior to the Dodgers' game vs. the Expos. 

To date, this is the only season in Dodger history where the team has finished exactly at .500 and not above or below it.

Offseason
November 17, 1992: Acquired Jody Reed from the Colorado Rockies for Rudy Seánez
December 5, 1992: Cory Snyder was signed as a free agent.
December 24, 1992: Acquired Tim Wallach from the Montreal Expos for Tim Barker
January 12, 1993: Kevin Elster was signed as a free agent.

Regular season

Season standings

Record vs. opponents

Opening Day lineup

Notable transactions

April 20, 1993: Ken Dayley was signed as a free agent.
May 17, 1993: Kevin Elster was released.
September 7, 1993: Acquired John DeSilva from the Detroit Tigers for Eric Davis

Roster

Starting Pitchers stats
Note: G = Games pitched; GS = Games started; IP = Innings pitched; W/L = Wins/Losses; ERA = Earned run average; BB = Walks allowed; SO = Strikeouts; CG = Complete games

Relief Pitchers stats
Note: G = Games pitched; GS = Games started; IP = Innings pitched; W/L = Wins/Losses; ERA = Earned run average; BB = Walks allowed; SO = Strikeouts; SV = Saves

Batting Stats
Note: Pos = Position; G = Games played; AB = At bats; Avg. = Batting average; R = Runs scored; H = Hits; HR = Home runs; RBI = Runs batted in; SB = Stolen bases

1993 Awards
1993 Major League Baseball All-Star Game
Mike Piazza reserve
Rookie of the Year Award
Mike Piazza
Baseball Digest Rookie All-Star
Mike Piazza
Pedro Martínez
Silver Slugger Award
Mike Piazza
Orel Hershiser
TSN Rookie of the Year Award
Mike Piazza
TSN National League All-Star
Mike Piazza
Player of the Week
Mike Piazza (Apr. 26 – May 2)
Mike Piazza (June 14–20)
Mike Piazza (May 16–22)

Farm system

Major League Baseball Draft

The Dodgers selected 57 players in this draft. Of those, seven of them would eventually play Major League baseball. The Dodgers lost their second round pick as a result of signing free agent pitcher Todd Worrell.

With the second overall pick in the draft the Dodgers selected right-handed pitcher Darren Dreifort from Wichita State University. Dreifort became one of only a select few players to make his professional debut in the Majors, without first appearing in a minor league game. He would play nine years in the Majors (all of them with the Dodgers), though serious injuries caused him to miss two full seasons and ultimately ended his career. His record was 48-60 with a 4.36 ERA in 274 games (113 starts).

In the 25th round, they selected catcher Paul Lo Duca from Arizona State University. In 11 seasons (seven with the Dodgers), he hit .286 with 80 homers and 481 RBIs while being a four time All-Star. LoDuca would later be mentioned in the Mitchell Report, which claimed that he had used human growth hormone (HGH) throughout his career and in fact contributed to other members of the Dodgers also using HGH.

References

External links 
1993 Los Angeles Dodgers uniform
Los Angeles Dodgers official web site
Baseball-Reference season page
Baseball Almanac season page

Los Angeles Dodgers seasons
Los Angeles Dodgers
1993 in sports in California